KORM-LP is a low power FM station broadcasting out of Corona, California. It is licensed to Templo Nueva Vida, Inc.

History
KORM-LP began broadcasting on 11 August 2009.

KORM Radio Maranata 101.5 FM is a Christian radio station with studios at 930 E. Ontario Ave. Corona, CA. USA.

This radio station can be heard on Internet at: http://templonuevavida.org / http://radiomaranata.org / Search in Tunein as: Korm Radio Maranata / Or with any 
audio player at: http://tnvradio.verbodevida.org

References

External links
 

2009 establishments in California
Radio stations established in 2009
ORM-LP
Mass media in Corona, California
ORM-LP